Snæfrithr Svásadottir (or Snjófríthr Svásadóttir, Norwegian: Snøfrid Svåsedatter) also called Snæfride finzsku (Snæfrithr the Finnish/Sami) was, according to medieval tradition a wife of the Norwegian king Harald Fairhair. The legend is described in both Heimskringla and Ágrip, and she is briefly mentioned in Orkneyinga saga. She is described as a Sami woman and is according to the sagas, the ancestor of Harald Hardrada. With the exception of Ragnhild the Mighty, she is the only wife of Harald Fairhair mentioned by name outside of Heimskringla.

Saga account 
The sagas tell of king Harald being at a yule feast in Gudbrandsdalen at the estate Tofti, when he was visited by a giant called Svási arrived and invited him to his hut. In Svási's hut the king was presented to the giant's Finn (Sami) daughter Snæfrithr. The king was over come with lust and wanted to bed her, but Svási would not allow his daughter to be a concubine so the two were married. Harald is said to have spent all of his time with Snæfrithr and neglected his kingdom. During their three year long marriage she gave birth to 4 children: Sigurðr hrísi, Hálfdan háleggr, Guðrøðr ljómi and Rǫgnvaldr réttilbeini.

When Snæfrith suddenly died, Harald was beside himself with grief, but a man known as Thorleif the Wise convinced the king to leave the chamber where the queen laid and told him that it was not honorable to let the dead lie there in the same clothes she perished in. Harald agreed to have the clothes changed and the body moved but when his servants did so the body turned blue and started to smell awful. Men hurried to prepare a pyre, but before they burned her, toads, snakes and lizards crawled out of her body. When Harald realized Snæfrith had been a witch he became furious and had all his sons by Snæfrith sent away. Since that day Harald became ill-disposed towards magicians. When Rǫgnvaldr followed in his mother's footsteps, Harald sent his most loyal and beloved son Eirikr Bloodaxe to murder Rǫgnvaldr.

Flateyjarbók's Haralds þáttr hárfagra's first chapter centers around the story of Snæfrithr and Harald and credits a skaldic a "drapa" about Snæfrithr to Harald, Snæfríðardrápa. .

Popular Culture

A character inspired by Snæfrithr appears in season 5 of History Channel's Vikings, played by Norwegian actress Dagny Backer Johnsen.

References

Fairhair dynasty
9th-century Norwegian monarchs
Norwegian royal consorts
Norwegian Sámi people
Year of death unknown
Year of birth unknown
9th-century Norwegian people
Harald Fairhair